Won is an uncommon Korean surname.

People with the name
Won Gyun, 1540–1597, Joseon Dynasty naval commander
Won Sei-hoon, b. 1951, South Korean politician, former NIS chief
Won Seong-jin, b. 1985, South Korean professional Go player.
Won Woo-Young, b. 1982, South Korean sabre fencer
Won Lee-sak, better known by his in-game name PartinG, South Korean StarCraft II player

See also
Won (Korean given name)
Won (disambiguation)
Korean name
List of Korean family names

Korean-language surnames